This is an incomplete list of Acts of the Parliament of the United Kingdom for the years 1940–1959.  Note that the first parliament of the United Kingdom was held in 1801; parliaments between 1707 and 1800 were either parliaments of Great Britain or of Ireland.  For Acts passed up until 1707 see List of Acts of the Parliament of England and List of Acts of the Parliament of Scotland.  For Acts passed from 1707 to 1800 see List of Acts of the Parliament of Great Britain.  See also the List of Acts of the Parliament of Ireland.

For Acts of the devolved parliaments and assemblies in the United Kingdom, see the List of Acts of the Scottish Parliament, the List of Acts of the Northern Ireland Assembly, and the List of Acts and Measures of the National Assembly for Wales; see also the List of Acts of the Parliament of Northern Ireland.

The number shown after each Act's title is its chapter number. Acts passed before 1963 are cited using this number, preceded by the year(s) of the reign during which the relevant parliamentary session was held; thus the Union with Ireland Act 1800 is cited as "39 & 40 Geo. 3 c. 67", meaning the 67th Act passed during the session that started in the 39th year of the reign of George III and which finished in the 40th year of that reign.  Note that the modern convention is to use Arabic numerals in citations (thus "41 Geo. 3" rather than "41 Geo. III"). cts of the last session of the Parliament of Great Britain and the first session of the Parliament of the United Kingdom are both cited as "41 Geo. 3".  Acts passed from 1963 onwards are simply cited by calendar year and chapter number.

1940 – 1949

1940

3 & 4 Geo. 6

Public General Acts 

 Agricultural Wages (Regulation) Amendment Act 1940 c. 17
 Agricultural Wages (Regulation) (Scotland) Act 1940 c. 27
 Agriculture (Miscellaneous War Provisions) Act 1940 c. 14
 Agriculture (Miscellaneous War Provisions) (No. 2) Act 1940 c. 50
 Allied Forces Act 1940 c. 51
 Appropriation Act 1940 c. 46
 Appropriation (No. 2) Act 1940 c. 54
 Army and Air Force (Annual) Act 1940 c. 18
 British North America Act 1940 c. 36 (known in Canada as the Constitution Act, 1940)
 Colonial Development and Welfare Act 1940 c. 40
 Confirmation of Executors (War Service) (Scotland) Act 1940 c. 41
 Consolidated Fund (No. 1) Act 1940 c. 11
 Consolidated Fund (No. 2) Act 1940 c. 39
 Consolidated Fund (No. 3) Act 1940 c. 52
 Cotton Industry Act 1940 c. 9
 Courts (Emergency Powers) Amendment Act 1940 c. 37
 Czecho-Slovakia (Financial Claims and Refugees) Act 1940 c. 4
 Emergency Powers (Defence) Act 1940 c. 20
 Emergency Powers (Defence) (No. 2) Act 1940 c. 45
 Evidence and Powers of Attorney Act 1940 c. 28
 Finance Act 1940 c. 29
 Finance (No. 2) Act 1940 c. 48
 Gas and Steam Vehicles (Excise Duties) Act 1940 c. 6
 India and Burma (Emergency Provisions) Act 1940 c. 33
 India and Burma (Miscellaneous Amendments) Act 1940 c. 5
 Indian and Colonial Divorce Jurisdiction Act 1940 c. 35
 Industrial Assurance and Friendly Societies (Emergency Protection from Forfeiture) Act 1940 c. 10
 Isle of Man (Customs) Act 1940 c. 49
 Law Reform (Miscellaneous Provisions) (Scotland) Act 1940 c. 42
 Marriage (Scotland) (Emergency Provisions) Act 1940 c. 30
 Mental Deficiency (Scotland) Act 1940 c. 8
 Merchant Shipping (Salvage) Act 1940 c. 43
 Middlesex Deeds Act 1940 c. 34
 National Loans Act 1940 c. 3
 National Loans (No. 2) Act 1940 c. 23
 National Service (Armed Forces) Act 1940 c. 22
 National Service (Channel Islands) Act 1940 c. 24
 Old Age and Widows' Pensions Act 1940 c. 13
 Post Office and Telegraph Act 1940 c. 25
 Prolongation of Parliament Act 1940 c. 53
 Rating and Valuation (Postponement of Valuations) Act 1940 c. 12
 Remission of Rates (London) Act 1940 c. 32
 Societies (Miscellaneous Provisions) Act 1940 c. 19
 Securities (Validation) Act 1940 c. 55
 Solicitors (Emergency Provisions) Act 1940 c. 15
 Special Enactments (Extension of Time) Act 1940 c. 16
 Superannuation Schemes (War Service) Act 1940 c. 26
 Trade Boards and Road Haulage Wages (Emergency Provisions) Act 1940 c. 7
 Treachery Act 1940 c. 21
 Truck Act 1940 c. 38
 Unemployment Insurance Act 1940 c. 44
 War Charities Act 1940 c. 31
 Workmen's Compensation and Benefit (Byssinosis) Act 1940 c. 56
 Workmen's Compensation (Supplementary Allowances) Act 1940 c. 47

4 & 5 Geo. 6

Public General Acts 
 Expiring Laws Continuance Act 1940 c. 2
 Local Elections and Register of Electors (Temporary Provisions) Act 1940 c. 3
 Naval and Marine Forces (Temporary Release from Service) Act 1940 c. 4
 Railways Agreement (Powers) Act 1940 c. 5
 Scottish Fisheries Advisory Council Act 1940 c. 1

1941

4 & 5 Geo. 6

Public General Acts

 Agriculture (Miscellaneous Provisions) Act 1941 c. 50
 Air Raid Precautions (Postponement of Financial Investigation) Act 1941 c. 10
 Allied Powers (Maritime Courts) Act 1941 c. 21
 Appropriation Act 1941 c. 38
 Appropriation (No. 2) Act 1941 c. 43
 Army and Air Force (Annual) Act 1941 c. 17
 Chartered and Other Bodies (Temporary Provisions) Act 1941 c. 19
 Colonial War Risks Insurance (Guarantees) Act 1941 c. 35
 Consolidated Fund (No. 1) Act 1941 c. 6
 Consolidated Fund (No. 2) Act 1941 c. 9
 Consolidated Fund (No. 3) Act 1941 c. 26
 Determination of Needs Act 1941 c. 11
 Diplomatic Privileges (Extension) Act 1941 c. 7
 Finance Act 1941 c. 30
 Financial Powers (U.S.A. Securities) Act 1941 c. 36
 Fire Services (Emergency Provisions) Act 1941 c. 22
 Goods and Services (Price Control) Act 1941 c. 31
 House of Commons Disqualification (Temporary Provisions) Act 1941 c. 8
 India and Burma (Postponement of Elections) Act 1941 c. 44
 Isle of Man (Customs) Act 1941 c. 32
 Isle of Man (Detention) Act 1941 c. 16
 Justices (Supplemental List) Act 1941  c. 27
 Land Drainage (Scotland) Act 1941 c. 13
 Landlord and Tenant (War Damage) (Amendment) Act 1941 c. 41
 Liabilities (War-Time Adjustment) Act 1941 c. 24
 Local Elections and Register of Electors (Temporary Provisions) Act 1941 c. 49
 Local Government (Financial Provisions) Act 1941 c. 33
 Local Government (Financial Provisions) (Scotland) Act 1941 c. 45
 Marriage (Members of His Majesty's Forces) Act 1941 c. 47
 National Health Insurance, Contributory Pensions and Workmen's Compensation Act 1941 c. 39
 National Loans Act 1941 c. 18
 National Service Act 1941 c. 15
 Naval Discipline (Amendment) Act 1941 c. 29
 Pharmacy and Medicines Act 1941 c. 42
 Prolongation of Parliament Act 1941 c. 48
 Public and Other Schools (War Conditions) Act 1941 c. 20
 Public Works Loans Act 1941 c. 14
 Rating (War Damage) (Scotland) Act 1941 c. 25
 Repair of War Damage Act 1941 c. 34
 Solicitors Act 1941 c. 46
 Temporary Migration of Children (Guardianship) Act 1941 c. 23
 Trustee (War Damage Insurance) Act 1941 c. 28
 War Damage Act 1941 c. 12
 War Damage (Extension of Risk Period) Act 1941 c. 37
 War Damage to Land (Scotland) Act 1941 c. 40

Local Acts
 London County Council (Money) Act 1941 c.xi
 London, Midland and Scottish Railway Act 1941 c.xii

5 & 6 Geo. 6

Public General Acts
 Arthur Jenkins Indemnity Act 1941 c. 1
 Consolidated Fund (No. 1) Act 1941 (Session 2) c. 2
 Expiring Laws Continuance Act 1941 c. 3
 National Service (No. 2) Act 1941 c. 4

1942

5 & 6 Geo. 6

Public General Acts

 Allied Powers (War Service) Act 1942 c. 29
 Anglo-Venezuelan Treaty (Island of Patos) Act 1942 c. 17
 Appropriation Act 1942 c. 27
 Appropriation (No. 2) Act 1942 c. 33
 Appropriation (No. 3) Act 1942 c. 34
 Army and Air Force (Annual) Act 1942 c. 15
 Coal (Concurrent Leases) Act 1942 c. 19
 Consolidated Fund (No. 2) Act 1942 c. 12
 Consolidated Fund (No. 3) Act 1942 c. 22
 Courts (Emergency Powers) Amendment Act 1942 c. 36
 Education (Scotland) Act 1942 c. 5
 Finance Act 1942 c. 21
 Greenwich Hospital Act 1942 c. 35
 Housing (Rural Workers) (Scotland) Act 1942 c. 32
 India (Federal Court Judges) Act 1942 c. 7
 India and Burma (Temporary and Miscellaneous Provisions) Act 1942 c. 39
 Isle of Man (Customs) Act 1942 c. 25
 Landlord and Tenant (Requisitioned Land) Act 1942 c. 13
 Local Elections and Register of Electors (Temporary Provisions) Act 1942 c. 38
 Marriage (Scotland) Act 1942 c. 20
 Ministers of the Crown and House of Commons Disqualification Act 1942 c. 11
 Minister of Works and Planning Act 1942 c. 23
 National Loans Act 1942 c. 14
 National Service (Foreign Countries) Act 1942 c. 30
 Patents and Designs Act 1942 c. 6
 Pensions (Mercantile Marine) Act 1942 c. 26
 Post Office and Telegraph (Money) Act 1942 c. 24
 Prolongation of Parliament Act 1942 c. 37
 Restoration of Pre-War Trade Practices Act 1942 c. 9
 Royal Naval Volunteer Reserve Act 1942 c. 18
 Securities (Validation) Act 1942 c. 10
 Sugar Industry Act 1942 c. 16
 United States of America (Visiting Forces) Act 1942 c. 31
 War Damage (Amendment) Act 1942 c. 28
 War Orphans Act 1942 c. 8
 Welsh Courts Act 1942 c. 40

6 & 7 Geo. 6

Public General Acts
 Expiring Laws Continuance Act 1942 c. 1
 National Service Act 1942 c. 3
 Supreme Court (Northern Ireland) Act 1942 c. 2

1943

6 & 7 Geo. 6

Public General Acts

 Agriculture (Miscellaneous Provisions) Act 1943 c. 16
 Appropriation Act 1943 c. 31
 Appropriation (No. 2) Act 1943 c. 41
 Army and Air Force (Annual) Act 1943 c. 15
 British Nationality and Status of Aliens Act 1943 c. 14
 British North America Act 1943 c. 30
 Catering Wages Act 1943 c. 24
 Coal Act 1943 c. 38
 Consolidated Fund (No. 1) Act 1943 c. 4
 Consolidated Fund (No. 2) Act 1943 c. 11
 Consolidated Fund (No. 3) Act 1943 c. 20
 Courts (Emergency Powers) Act 1943 c. 19
 Crown Lands Act 1943 c. 7
 Isle of Man (Customs) Act 1943 c. 37
 Emergency Powers (Isle of Man Defence) Act 1943 c. 36
 Evidence and Powers of Attorney Act 1943 c. 18
 Finance Act 1943 c. 28
 Foreign Service Act 1943 c. 35
 House of Commons Disqualification (Temporary Provisions) Act 1943 c. 10
 Housing (Agricultural Population) (Scotland) Act 1943 c. 22
 Hydro-Electric Development (Scotland) Act 1943 c. 32
 Income Tax (Employments) Act 1943 c. 45
 Law Reform (Frustrated Contracts) Act 1943 c. 40
 Minister of Town and Country Planning Act 1943 c. 5
 National Loans Act 1943 c. 13
 Nurses Act 1943 c. 17
 Nurses (Scotland) Act 1943 c. 33
 Parliament (Elections and Meeting) Act 1943 c. 48
 Pensions and Determination of Needs Act 1943 c. 27
 Pensions Appeals Tribunals Act 1943 c. 39
 Police (Appeals) Act 1943 c. 8
 Price Control (Regulation of Disposal of Stocks) Act 1943 c. 47
 Prolongation of Parliament Act 1943 c. 46
 Railway Freight Rebates Act 1943 c. 23
 Regency Act 1943 c. 42
 Rent of Furnished Houses Control (Scotland) Act 1943 c. 44
 Restriction of Ribbon Development (Temporary Development) Act 1943 c. 34
 Town and Country Planning (Interim Development) (Scotland) Act 1943 c. 43
 Settled Land and Trustee Acts (Court's General Powers) Act 1943 c. 25
 Telegraph Act 1943 c. 26
 Town and Country Planning (Interim Development) Act 1943 c. 29
 Universities and Colleges (Trusts) Act 1943 c. 9
 War Damage Act 1943 c. 21
 War Damage (Amendment) Act 1943 c. 12
 Workmen's Compensation Act 1943 c. 6
 Workmen's Compensation (Temporary Increases) Act 1943 c. 49

7 & 8 Geo. 6

Public General Acts
 Expiring Laws Continuance Act 1943 c. 1
 Local Elections and Register of Electors (Temporary Provisions) Act 1943 c. 2
 Mining Industry (Welfare Fund) Act 1943 c. 3

1944

7 & 8 Geo. 6

Public General Acts

 Agriculture (Miscellaneous Provisions) Act 1944 c. 28
 Appropriation Act 1944 c. 30
 Appropriation (No. 2) Act 1944 c. 37
 Army and Air Force (Annual) Act 1944 c. 18
 Consolidated Fund (No. 1) Act 1944 c. 4
 Consolidated Fund (No. 2) Act 1944 c. 17
 Consolidated Fund (No. 3) Act 1944 c. 20
 Courts (Emergency Powers) (Scotland) Act 1944 c. 6
 Diplomatic Privileges (Extension) Act 1944 c. 44
 Disabled Persons (Employment) Act 1944 c. 10
 Education Act 1944 c. 31
 Finance Act 1944 c. 23
 Food and Drugs (Milk and Dairies) Act 1944 c. 29
 Guardianship (Refugee Children) Act 1944 c. 8
 Herring Industry Act 1944 c. 32
 House of Commons Disqualification (Temporary Provisions) Acts, 1941 to 1944 c. 11
 House of Commons (Redistribution of Seats) Act 1944 c. 41
 Housing (Scotland) Act 1944 c. 39
 Housing (Temporary Accommodation) Act 1944 c. 36
 Housing (Temporary Provisions) Act 1944 c. 33
 Income Tax (Offices and Employments) Act 1944 c. 12
 India (Attachment of States) Act 1944 c. 14
 India (Miscellaneous Provisions) Act 1944 c. 38
 Isle of Man (Customs) Act 1944 c. 27
 Landlord and Tenant (Requisitioned Land) Act 1944 c. 5
 Law Officers Act 1944 c. 25
 Liabilities (War-Time Adjustment) Act 1944 c. 40
 Matrimonial Causes (War Marriages) Act 1944 c. 43
 Ministry of National Insurance Act 1944 c. 46
 National Fire Service Regulations (Indemnity) Act 1944 c. 35
 National Loans Acts, 1939 to 1944 c. 19
 Naval Forces (Extension of Service) Act 1944 c. 13
 Parliamentary Electors (War-Time Registration) Act 1944 c. 24
 Pensions (Increase) Act 1944 c. 21
 Police and Firemen (War Service) Act 1944 c. 22
 Prize Salvage Act 1944 c. 7
 Prolongation of Parliament Act 1944 c. 45
 Public Works Loans Act 1944 c. 16
 Reinstatement in Civil Employment Act 1944 c. 15
 Rural Water Supplies and Sewerage Act 1944 c. 26
 Supreme Court of Judicature (Amendment) Act 1944 c. 9
 Town and Country Planning Act 1944 c. 47
 Unemployment Insurance (Increase of Benefit) Act 1944 c. 42
 Validation of War-time Leases Act 1944 c. 34

8 & 9 Geo. 6

Public General Acts

 Consolidated Fund (No. 1) Act 1944 (Session 2) c. 1
 Expiring Laws Continuance Act 1944 c. 2
 Local Elections and Register of Electors (Temporary Provisions) Act 1944 c. 3

1945

8 & 9 Geo. 6

Public General Acts

 Appropriation Act 1945 c. 25
 Army and Air Force (Annual) Act 1945 c. 22
 Camps Act 1945 c. 26
 Colonial Development and Welfare Act 1945 c. 20
 Compensation of Displaced Officers (War Service) Act 1945 c. 10
 Consolidated Fund (No. 2) Act 1945 c. 4
 Consolidated Fund (No. 3) Act 1945 c. 13
 Distribution of Industry Act 1945 c. 36
 Education (Scotland) Act 1945 c. 37
 Emergency Powers (Defence) Act 1945 c. 31
 Export Guarantees Act 1945 c. 9
 Family Allowances Act 1945 c. 41
 Finance Act 1945 c. 24
 Forestry Act 1945 c. 35
 Government of Burma (Temporary Provisions) Act 1945 c. 30
 Housing (Temporary Accommodation) Act 1945 c. 39
 Hydro-Electric Undertakings (Valuation for Rating) (Scotland) Act 1945 c. 34
 Income Tax Act 1945 c. 32
 India (Estate Duty) Act 1945 c. 7
 Law Reform (Contributory Negligence) Act 1945 c. 28
 Liabilities (War-Time Adjustment) (Scotland) Act 1945 c. 29
 Licensing Planning (Temporary Provisions) Act 1945 c. 15
 Limitation (Enemies and War Prisoners) Act 1945 c. 16
 Local Authorities Loans Act 1945 c. 18
 Local Government (Boundary Commission) Act 1945 c. 38
 Ministry of Civil Aviation Act 1945 c. 21
 Ministry of Fuel and Power Act 1945 c. 19
 National Loans Act 1945 c. 23
 Northern Ireland (Miscellaneous Provisions) Act 1945 c. 12
 Nurses Act 1945 c. 6
 Police (His Majesty's Inspectors of Constabulary) Act 1945 c. 11
 Postponement of Polling Day Act 1945 c. 40
 Representation of the People Act 1945 c. 5
 Requisitioned Land and War Works Act 1945 c. 43
 Road Transport Lighting (Cycles) Act 1945 c. 8
 Teachers (Superannuation) Act 1945 c. 14
 Town and Country Planning (Scotland) Act 1945 c. 33
 Treason Act 1945 c. 44
 Wages Councils Act 1945 c. 17
 Water Act 1945 c. 42
 Welsh Church (Burial Grounds) Act 1945 c. 27

9 & 10 Geo. 6

Public General Acts
 Bretton Woods Agreements Act 1945 c. 19
 British Settlements Act 1945 c. 7
 Building Materials and Housing Act 1945 c. 20
 Chartered and Other Bodies (Resumption of Elections) Act 1945 c. 6
 Civil Defence (Suspension of Powers) Act 1945 c. 12
 Coatbridge and Springburn Elections (Validation) Act 1945 c. 3
 Consolidated Fund (No. 1) Act 1945 c. 4
 Elections and Jurors Act 1945 c. 21
 Expiring Laws Continuance Act 1945 c. 9
 Finance (No. 2) Act 1945 c. 13
 Indian Divorce Act 1945 c. 5
 Indian Franchise Act 1945 c. 2
 Inshore Fishing Industry Act 1945 c. 11
 Isle of Man (Customs) Act 1945 c. 14
 Local Elections (Service Abroad) Act 1945 c. 1
 Police (Overseas Service) Act 1945 c. 17
 Public Health (Scotland) Act 1945 c. 15
 Statutory Orders (Special Procedure) Act 1945 c. 18
 Supplies and Services (Transitional Powers) Act 1945 c. 10
 War Damage (Valuation Appeals) Act 1945 c. 8
 Workmen's Compensation (Pneumoconiosis) Act 1945 c. 16

1946

9 & 10 Geo. 6

Public General Acts

 Acquisition of Land (Authorisation Procedure) Act 1946 c. 49
 Agricultural Development (Ploughing Up of Land) Act 1946 c. 32
 Agriculture (Artificial Insemination) Act 1946 c. 29
 Appropriation Act 1946 c. 65
 Army and Air Force (Annual) Act 1946 c. 47
 Association of County Councils (Scotland) Act 1946 c. 77
 Assurance Companies Act 1946 c. 28
 Atomic Energy Act 1946 c. 80
 Bank of England Act 1946 c. 27
 Borrowing (Control and Guarantees) Act 1946 c. 58
 British Museum Act 1946 c. 56
 British North America Act 1946 c. 63
 Building Restrictions (War-Time Contraventions) Act 1946 c. 35
 Burma Legislature Act 1946 c. 57
 Cable and Wireless Act 1946 c. 82
 Camberwell, Bristol and Nottingham Elections (Validation) Act 1946 c. 43
 Civil Aviation Act 1946 c. 70
 Coal Industry Nationalisation Act 1946 c. 59
 Coinage Act 1946 c. 74
 Consolidated Fund (No. 1) Act 1946 c. 33
 Diplomatic Privileges (Extension) Act 1946 c. 66
 Dock Workers (Regulation of Employment) Act 1946 c. 22
 Education Act 1946 c. 50
 Education (Scotland) Act 1946 c. 72
 Emergency Laws (Transitional Provisions) Act 1946 c. 26
 Finance Act 1946 c. 64
 Furnished Houses (Rent Control) Act 1946 c. 34
 Hill Farming Act 1946 c. 73
 Housing (Financial and Miscellaneous Provisions) Act 1946 c. 48
 Housing (Financial Provisions) (Scotland) Act 1946 c. 54
 India (Central Government and Legislature) Act 1946 c. 39
 India (Proclamations of Emergency) Act 1946 c. 23
 Isle of Man (Customs) Act 1946 c. 69
 Licensing Planning (Temporary Provisions) Act 1946 c. 53
 Local Government (Financial Provisions) Act 1946 c. 24
 Local Government (Financial Provision) (Scotland) Act 1946 c. 25
 Ministerial Salaries Act 1946 c. 55
 Ministers of the Crown (Transfer of Functions) Act 1946 c. 31
 Miscellaneous Financial Provisions Act 1946 c. 40
 National Health Service Act 1946 c. 81
 National Insurance Act 1946 c. 67
 National Insurance (Industrial Injuries) Act 1946 c. 62
 National Service (Release of Conscientious Objectors) Act 1946 c. 38
 New Towns Act 1946 c. 68
 Patents and Designs Act 1946 c. 44
 Police Act 1946 c. 46
 Police (Scotland) Act 1946 c. 71
 Post Office and Telegraph (Money) Act 1946 c. 51
 Public Notaries (War Service of Articled Clerks) Act 1946 c. 79
 Public Works Loans Act 1946 c. 41
 Public Works Loans (No. 2) Act 1946 c. 75
 Railways (Valuation for Rating) Act 1946 c. 61
 Roosevelt Memorial Act 1946 c. 83
 Statutory Instruments Act 1946 c. 36
 Straits Settlements (Repeal) Act 1946 c. 37
 Superannuation Act 1946 c. 60
 Supreme Court of Judicature (Circuit Officers) Act 1946 c. 78
 Trade Disputes and Trade Unions Act 1946 c. 52
 Trunk Roads Act 1946 c. 30
 Unemployment Insurance (Eire Volunteers) Act 1946 c. 76
 United Nations Act 1946 c. 45
 Water (Scotland) Act 1946 c. 42

10 & 11 Geo. 6

Public General Acts

 Expiring Laws Continuance Act 1946 c. 1
 Ministry of Defence Act 1946 c. 2
 Royal Marines Act 1946 c. 4
 Unemployment and Family Allowances (Northern Ireland Agreement) Act 1946 c. 3

1947

10 & 11 Geo. 6

Public General Acts

 Acquisition of Land (Authorisation Procedure) (Scotland) Act 1947 c. 35
 Agriculture Act 1947 c. 48
 Agriculture (Emergency Payments) Act 1947 c. 32
 Agricultural Wages (Regulation) Act 1947 c. 15
 Air Navigation Act 1947 c. 18
 Appellate Jurisdiction Act 1947 c. 11
 Appropriation Act 1947 c. 52
 Army and Air Force (Annual) Act 1947 c. 25
 Births and Deaths Registration Act 1947 c. 12
 Civic Restaurants Act 1947 c. 22
 Companies Act 1947 c. 47
 Consolidated Fund (No. 1) Act 1947 c. 17
 Cotton (Centralised Buying) Act 1947 c. 26
 Crown Proceedings Act 1947 c. 44
 County Councils Association Expenses (Amendment) Act 1947 c. 13
 Dog Racecourse Betting (Temporary Provisions) Act 1947 c. 20
 Education (Exemptions) (Scotland) Act 1947 c. 36
 Electricity Act 1947 c. 54
 Exchange Control Act 1947 c. 14
 Finance Act 1947 c. 35
 Fire Services Act 1947 c. 41
 Foreign Marriage Act 1947 c. 33
 Forestry Act 1947 c. 21
 Greenwich Hospital Act 1947 c. 5
 House of Commons (Redistribution of Seats) Act 1947 c. 10
 Indian Independence Act 1947 c. 30
 Industrial Organisation and Development Act 1947 c. 40
 Isle of Man (Customs) Act 1947 c. 50
 Isle of Man Harbours Act 1947 c. 28
 Local Government (Scotland) Act 1947 c. 43
 Malta (Reconstruction) Act 1947 c. 9
 National Health Service (Scotland) Act 1947 c. 27
 National Service Act 1947 c. 31
 Naval Forces (Enforcement of Maintenance Liabilities) Act 1947 c. 24
 Northern Ireland Act 1947 c. 37
 Penicillin Act 1947 c. 29
 Pensions (Increase) Act 1947 c. 7
 Polish Resettlement Act 1947 c. 19
 Probation Officers (Superannuation) Act 1947 c. 38
 Public Offices (Site) Act 1947 c. 45
 Road Traffic (Driving Licences) Act 1947 c. 8
 Statistics of Trade Act 1947 c. 39
 Summer Time Act 1947 c. 16
 Supplies and Services (Extended Purposes) Act 1947 c. 55
 Town and Country Planning Act 1947 c. 51
 Town and Country Planning (Scotland) Act 1947 c. 53
 Trafalgar Estates Act 1947 c. 34
 Transport Act 1947 c. 49
 Treaties of Peace (Italy, Roumania, Bulgaria, Hungary and Finland) Act 1947 c. 23
 Trustee Savings Banks Act 1947 c. 6
 Wellington Museum Act 1947 c. 46

11 & 12 Geo. 6

Public General Acts

 Burma Independence Act 1947 c. 3
 Ceylon Independence Act 1947 c. 7
 Emergency Laws (Miscellaneous Provisions) Act 1947 c. 10
 Expiring Laws Continuance Act 1947 c. 1
 Finance (No. 2) Act 1947 c. 9
 Housing (Temporary Accommodation) Act 1947 c. 6
 Jersey and Guernsey (Financial Provisions) Act 1947 c. 2
 Mandated and Trust Territories Act 1947 c. 8
 Medical Practitioners and Pharmacists Act 1947 c. 11
 Ministers of the Crown (Treasury Secretaries) Act 1947 c. 5
 New Zealand Constitution Amendment Act 1947 c. 4
 Pensions (Governors of Dominions, &c.) Act 1947 c. 12
 Public Works Loans Act 1947 c. 13

1948

11 & 12 Geo. 6

Public General Acts

 Agricultural Holdings Act 1948 c. 63
 Agricultural Wages Act 1948 c. 47
 Agriculture (Scotland) Act 1948 c. 45
 Animals Act 1948 c. 35
 Appropriation Act 1948 c. 50
 Army and Air Force (Annual) Act 1948 c. 28
 Army and Air Force (Women's Service) Act 1948 c. 21
 Attempted Rape Act 1948 c. 19
 British Nationality Act 1948 c. 56
 Children Act 1948 c. 43
 Cinematograph Films Act 1948 c. 23
 Civil Defence Act 1948 c. 5
 Companies Act 1948 c. 38
 Consolidated Fund (No. 1) Act 1948 c. 18
 Cotton Spinning (Re-equipment Subsidy) Act 1948 c. 31
 Criminal Justice Act 1948 c. 58
 Development of Inventions Act 1948 c. 60
 Education (Miscellaneous Provisions) Act 1948 c. 40
 Employment and Training Act 1948 c. 46
 Export Guarantees Act 1948 c. 54
 Factories Act 1948 c. 55
 Finance Act 1948 c. 49
 Gas Act 1948 c. 67
 House of Commons Members' Fund Act 1948 c. 36
 Industrial Assurance and Friendly Societies Act 1948 c. 39
 Isle of Man (Customs) Act 1948 c. 61
 Law Reform (Personal Injuries) Act 1948 c. 41
 Laying of Documents before Parliament (Interpretation) Act 1948 c. 59
 Local Government Act 1948 c. 26
 Lord High Commissioner (Church of Scotland) Act 1948 c. 30
 Merchant Shipping Act 1948 c. 44
 Monopolies and Restrictive Practices (Inquiry and Control) Act 1948 c. 66
 Motor Spirit (Regulation) Act 1948 c. 34
 National Assistance Act 1948 c. 29
 National Insurance (Industrial Injuries) Act 1948 c. 42
 National Service Act 1948 c. 64
 Nurseries and Child-Minders Regulation Act 1948 c. 53
 Overseas Resources Development Act 1948 c. 15
 Palestine Act 1948 c. 27
 Police Pensions Act 1948 c. 24
 Post Office and Telegraph (Money) Act 1948 c. 16
 Princess Elizabeth's and Duke of Edinburgh's Annuities Act 1948 c. 14
 Public Registers and Records (Scotland) Act 1948 c. 57
 Public Works Loans Act 1948 c. 48
 Radioactive Substances Act 1948 c. 37
 Representation of the People Act 1948 c. 65
 Requisitioned Land and War Works Act 1948 c. 17
 River Boards Act 1948 c. 32
 Royal Marines Act 1948 c. 25
 Statute Law Revision Act 1948 c. 62
 Superannuation (Miscellaneous Provisions) Act 1948 c. 33
 Supreme Court of Judicature (Amendment) Act 1948 c. 20
 Veterinary Surgeons Act 1948 c. 52
 Water Act 1948 c. 22
 White Fish and Herring Industries Act 1948 c. 51

12, 13 & 14 Geo. 6

Public General Acts

 Administration of Justice (Scotland) Act 1948 c. 10
 Civil Defence Act 1948 c. 5
 Colonial Stock Act 1948 c. 1
 Debts Clearing Offices Act 1948 c. 2
 Expiring Laws Continuance Act, 1948 c. 3
 Judges Pensions (India and Burma) Act 1948 c. 4
 National Service (Amendment) Act 1948 c. 6
 Prize Act 1948 c. 9
 Recall of Army and Air Force Prisoners Act 1948 c. 8
 Wages Councils Act 1948 c. 7

1949 (12, 13 & 14 Geo. 6)

Public General Acts

 Adoption of Children Act 1949 c. 98
 Agricultural Holdings (Scotland) Act 1949 c. 75
 Agricultural Marketing Act 1949 c. 38
 Agriculture (Miscellaneous Provisions) Act 1949 c. 37
 Agricultural Wages (Scotland) Act 1949 c. 30
 Air Corporations Act 1949 c. 91
 Airways Corporations Act 1949 c. 57
 American Aid and European Payments (Financial Provisions) Act 1949 c. 17
 Appropriation Act 1949 c. 48
 Armed Forces (Housing Loans) Act 1949 c. 77
 Army and Air Force (Annual) Act 1949 c. 28
 Auxiliary and Reserve Forces Act 1949 c. 96
 British Film Institute Act 1949 c. 35
 British North America Act 1949 c. 22 (known in Canada as the Newfoundland Act)
 British North America (No. 2) Act 1949 c. 81
 British Transport Commission Act 1949 c. 29
 Cinematograph Film Production (Special Loans) Act 1949 c. 20
 Civil Aviation Act 1949 c. 67
 Coal Industry Act 1949 c. 53
 Coal Industry (No. 2) Act 1949 c. 79
 Coast Protection Act 1949 c. 74
 Colonial Development and Welfare Act 1949 c. 49
 Colonial Loans Act 1949 c. 50
 Colonial Naval Defence Act 1949 c. 18
 Commonwealth Telegraphs Act 1949 c. 39
 Consolidated Fund (No. 1) Act 1949 c. 24
 Consolidation of Enactments (Procedure) Act 1949 c. 33
 Consular Conventions Act 1949 c. 29
 Criminal Justice (Scotland) Act 1949 c. 94
 Distribution of German Enemy Property Act 1949 c. 85
 Docking and Nicking of Horses Act 1949 c. 70
 Education (Scotland) Act 1949 c. 19
 Election Commissioners Act 1949 c. 90
 Electoral Registers Act 1949 c. 86
 Expiring Laws Continuance Act 1949 c. 71
 Export Guarantees Act 1949 c. 14
 Festival of Britain (Supplementary Provisions) Act 1949 c. 102
 Finance Act 1949 c. 47
 House of Commons (Indemnification of Certain Members) Act 1949 c. 46
 House of Commons (Redistribution of Seats) Act 1949 c. 66
 Housing Act 1949 c. 60
 Housing (Scotland) Act 1949 c. 61
 India (Consequential Provision) Act 1949 c. 92
 Ireland Act 1949 c. 41
 Iron and Steel Act 1949 c. 72
 Isle of Man (Customs) Act 1949 c. 58
 Juries Act 1949 c. 27
 Justices of the Peace Act 1949 c. 101
 Landlord and Tenant (Rent Control) Act 1949 c. 40
 Lands Tribunal Act 1949 c. 42
 Law Reform (Miscellaneous Provisions) Act 1949 c. 100
 Legal Aid and Advice Act 1949 c. 51
 Legal Aid and Solicitors (Scotland) Act 1949 c. 63
 Licensing Act 1949 c. 59
 Local Government Boundary Commission (Dissolution) Act 1949 c. 83
 Marriage Act 1949 c. 76
 Married Women (Maintenance) Act 1949 c. 99
 Married Women (Restraint upon Anticipation) Act 1949 c. 78
 Merchant Shipping (Safety Convention) Act 1949 c. 43
 Milk (Special Designations) Act 1949 c. 34
 Minister of Food (Financial Powers) Act 1949 c. 15
 National Health Service (Amendment) Act 1949 c. 93
 National Insurance Act 1949 c. 56
 National Parks and Access to the Countryside Act 1949 c. 97
 National Theatre Act 1949 c. 16
 New Forest Act 1949 c. 69
 Nurses Act 1949 c. 73
 Nurses (Scotland) Act 1949 c. 95
 Overseas Resources Development Act 1949 c. 65
 Parliament Act 1949 c. 103
 Patents Act 1949 c. 87
 Patents and Designs Act 1949 c. 62
 Pensions Appeal Tribunals Act 1949 c. 12
 Prevention of Damage by Pests Act 1949 c. 55
 Profits Tax Act 1949 c. 64
 Public Works (Festival of Britain) Act 1949 c. 26
 Public Works Loans Act 1949 c. 82
 Railway and Canal Commission (Abolition) Act 1949 c. 11
 Registered Designs Act 1949 c. 88
 Representation of the People Act 1949 c. 68
 Savings Banks Act 1949 c. 13
 Slaughter of Animals (Scotland) Act 1949 c. 52
 Social Services (Northern Ireland Agreement) Act 1949 c. 23
 Solicitors, Public Notaries, &c. Act 1949 c. 21
 Special Roads Act 1949 c. 32
 Superannuation Act 1949 c. 44
 Telegraph Act 1949 c. 80
 Tenancy of Shops (Scotland) Act 1949 c. 25
 U.S.A. Veterans' Pensions (Administration) Act 1949 c. 45
 Vehicles (Excise) Act 1949 c. 89
 War Damage (Public Utility Undertakings, &c.) Act 1949 c. 36
 War Damaged Sites Act 1949 c. 84
 Water (Scotland) Act 1949 c. 31
 Wireless Telegraphy Act 1949 c. 54

1950 – 1959

1950

14 Geo. 6

Public General Acts

 Adoption Act 1950 c. 26
 Agriculture (Miscellaneous Provisions) Act 1950 c. 17
 Air Force Reserve Act 1950 c. 33
 Allotments Act 1950 c. 31
 Allotments (Scotland) Act 1950 c. 38
 Appropriation Act, 1950 c. 16
 Arbitration Act 1950 c. 27
 Army and Air Force (Annual) Act 1950 c. 3
 Army Reserve Act 1950 c. 32
 Cinematograph Film Production (Special Loans) Act 1950 c. 18
 Coal-Mining (Subsidence) Act 1950 c. 23
 Colonial and Other Territories (Divorce Jurisdiction) Act 1950 c. 20
 Consolidated Fund Act 1950 c. 1
 Diplomatic Privileges (Extension) Act 1950 c. 7
 Diseases of Animals Act 1950 c. 36
 Distribution of Industry Act 1950 c. 8
 Finance Act 1950 c. 15
 Foreign Compensation Act 1950 c. 12
 High Court and County Court Judges Act 1950 c. 4
 Highways (Provision of Cattle Grids) Act 1950 c. 24
 Housing (Scotland) Act 1950 c. 34
 International Organisations (Immunities and Privileges) Act 1950 c. 14
 Isle of Man (Customs) Act 1950 c. 19
 London Government Act 1950 c. 22
 Maintenance Orders Act 1950 c. 37
 Matrimonial Causes Act 1950 c. 25
 Medical Act 1950 c. 29
 Merchant Shipping Act 1950 c. 9
 Midwives (Amendment) Act 1950 c. 13
 Miscellaneous Financial Provisions Act 1950 c. 21
 National Service Act 1950 c. 30
 Newfoundland (Consequential Provisions) Act 1950 c. 5
 Post Office and Telegraph (Money) Act 1950 c. 2
 Public Registers and Records (Scotland) Act 1950 c. 11
 Public Utilities Street Works Act 1950 c. 39
 Royal Patriotic Fund Corporation Act 1950 c. 10
 Shops Act 1950 c. 28
 Statute Law Revision Act 1950 c. 6

14 & 15 Geo. 6

Public General Acts

 Administration of Justice (Pensions) Act 1950 c. 11
 Colonial Development and Welfare Act, 1950 c. 4
 Dangerous Drugs (Amendment) Act 1950 c. 7
 European Payments Union (Financial Provisions) Act 1950 c. 8
 Exchequer and Audit Departments Act 1950 c. 3
 Expiring Laws Continuance Act 1950 c. 1
 Public Works Loans Act 1950 c. 5
 Reinstatement in Civil Employment Act 1950 c. 10
 Restoration of Pre-War Trade Practices Act 1950 c. 9
 Solicitors Act 1950 c. 6
 Superannuation Act 1950 c. 2

1951

14 & 15 Geo. 6

Public General Acts

 Alkali, &c., Works Regulation (Scotland) Act 1951 c. 21
 Appropriation Act 1951 c. 44
 Army and Air Force (Annual) Act 1951 c. 24
 British North America Act 1951 c. 32
 Coal Industry Act 1951 c. 41
 Common Informers Act 1951 c. 39
 Consolidated Fund Act 1951 c. 12
 Consolidated Fund (No. 2) Act 1951 c. 16
 Consolidated Fund (Civil List Provisions) Act 1951 c. 50
 Courts-Martial (Appeals) Act 1951 c. 46
 Criminal Law Amendment Act 1951 c. 36
 Dangerous Drugs Act 1951 c. 48
 Export Guarantees Act 1951 c. 17
 Festival of Britain (Additional Loans) Act 1951 c. 47
 Festival of Britain (Sunday Opening) Act 1951 c. 14
 Finance Act 1951 c. 43
 Fireworks Act 1951 c. 58
 Fire Services Act 1951 c. 27
 Forestry Act 1951 c. 61
 Fraudulent Mediums Act 1951 c. 33
 Guardianship and Maintenance of Infants Act 1951 c. 56
 Isle of Man (Customs) Act 1951 c. 51
 Leasehold Property (Temporary Provisions) Act 1951 c. 38
 Livestock Rearing Act 1951 c. 18
 Local Government (Scotland) Act 1951 c. 15
 Long Leases (Temporary Provisions) (Scotland) Act 1951 c. 28
 Midwives Act 1951 c. 53
 Midwives (Scotland) Act 1951 c. 54
 Mineral Workings Act 1951 c. 60
 Ministry of Materials Act 1951 c. 42
 National Assistance (Amendment) Act 1951 c. 57
 National Health Service Act 1951 c. 31
 National Insurance Act 1951 c. 34
 New Streets Act 1951 c. 40
 Nurses (Scotland) Act 1951 c. 55
 Overseas Resources Development Act 1951 c. 20
 Penicillin (Merchant Ships) Act 1951 c. 13
 Pet Animals Act 1951 c.35
 Price Control and other Orders (Indemnity) Act 1951 c. 59
 Rag Flock and Other Filling Materials Act 1951 c. 63
 Reserve and Auxiliary Forces (Protection of Civil Interests) Act 1951 c. 65
 Reserve and Auxiliary Forces (Training) Act 1951 c. 23
 Reverend J. G. MacManaway's Indemnity Act 1951 c. 29
 Rivers (Prevention of Pollution) Act 1951 c. 64
 Rivers (Prevention of Pollution) (Scotland) Act 1951 c. 66
 Rural Water Supplies and Sewerage Act 1951 c. 45
 Salmon and Freshwater Fisheries (Protection) (Scotland) Act 1951 c. 26
 Sea Fish Industry Act 1951 c. 30
 Slaughter of Animals (Amendment) Act 1951 c. 49
 Supplies and Services (Defence Purposes) Act 1951 c. 25
 Telegraph Act 1951 c. 37
 Telephone Act 1951 c. 52
 Tithe Act 1951 c. 62
 Town and Country Planning (Amendment) Act 1951 c. 19
 Workmen's Compensation (Supplementation) Act 1951 c. 22

Local Acts
 Lloyd's Act 1951 c. viii

15 & 16 Geo. 6 & 1 Eliz. 2

Public General Acts
 Border Rivers (Prevention of Pollution) Act 1951 c. 7
 Consolidated Fund (No. 3) Act 1951 c. 1
 Expiring Laws Continuance Act 1951 c. 3
 Home Guard Act 1951 c. 8
 Japanese Treaty of Peace Act 1951 c. 6
 Ministers of the Crown (Parliamentary Under-Secretaries) Act 1951 c. 9
 Mr. Speaker Clifton Brown's Retirement Act 1951 c. 2
 Pneumoconiosis and Byssinosis Benefit Act 1951 c. 4
 Public Works Loans Act 1951 c. 5

1952

15 & 16 Geo. 6 & 1 Eliz. 2

Public General Acts

 Affiliation Orders Act 1952 c. 41
 Agriculture (Fertilisers) Act 1952 c. 15
 Agriculture (Ploughing Grants) Act 1952 c. 35
 Agriculture (Poisonous Substances) Act 1952 c. 60
 Appropriation Act 1952 c. 38
 Army and Air Force (Annual) Act 1952 c. 24
 Children and Young Persons (Amendment) Act 1952 c. 50
 Cinematograph Act 1952 c. 68
 Cinematograph Film Production (Special Loans) Act 1952 c. 20
 Civil List Act 1952 c. 37
 Cockfighting Act 1952 c. 59
 Consolidated Fund Act 1952 c. 16
 Corneal Grafting Act 1952 c. 28
 Costs in Criminal Cases Act 1952 c. 48
 Court of Chancery of Lancaster Act 1952 c. 49
 Cremation Act 1952 c. 31
 Crown Lessees (Protection of Sub-Tenants) Act 1952 c. 40
 Customs and Excise Act 1952 c. 44
 Defamation Act 1952 c. 66
 Diplomatic Immunities (Commonwealth Countries and Republic of Ireland) Act 1952 c. 18
 Disposal of Uncollected Goods Act 1952 c. 43
 Distribution of German Enemy Property Act 1952 c. 30
 Electricity Supply (Meters) Act 1952 c. 32
 Empire Settlement Act 1952 c. 26
 Export Guarantees Act 1952 c. 21
 Family Allowances and National Insurance Act 1952 c. 29
 Festival Pleasure Gardens Act 1952 c. 13
 Finance Act 1952 c. 33
 Heating Appliances (Fireguards) Act 1952 c. 42
 Housing Act 1952 c. 53
 Housing (Scotland) Act 1952 c. 63
 Hydro-Electric Development (Scotland) Act 1952 c. 22
 Hypnotism Act 1952 c. 46
 Income Tax Act 1952 c. 10
 Industrial and Provident Societies Act 1952 c. 17
 Insurance Contracts (War Settlement) Act 1952 c. 56
 Intestates' Estates Act 1952 c. 64
 Irish Sailors and Soldiers Land Trust Act 1952 c. 58
 Isle of Man (Customs) Act 1952 c. 51
 Judicial Offices (Salaries, &c.) Act 1952 c. 12
 Licensed Premises in New Towns Act 1952 c. 65
 Magistrates' Courts Act 1952 c. 55
 Marine and Aviation Insurance (War Risks) Act 1952 c. 57
 Merchant Shipping Act 1952 c. 14
 Metropolitan Police (Borrowing Powers) Act 1952 c. 19
 Miners' Welfare Act 1952 c. 23
 Motor Vehicles (International Circulation) Act 1952 c. 39
 National Health Service Act 1952 c. 25
 New Towns Act 1952 c. 27
 Northern Ireland (Foyle Fisheries) Act 1952 c. 11
 Pensions (Increase) Act 1952 c. 45
 Post Office (Amendment) Act 1952 c. 36
 Post Office and Telegraph (Money) Act 1952 c. 34
 Prison Act 1952 c. 52
 Rating and Valuation (Scotland) Act 1952 c. 47
 Town Development Act 1952 c. 54
 Visiting Forces Act 1952 c. 67

Local Acts

 City of London (Guild Churches) Act 1952 c. xxxviii
 London County Council (Holland House) Act 1952 c. v

1 & 2 Eliz. 2

Public General Acts

 Civil Contingencies Fund Act 1952 c. 2
 Colonial Loans Act 1952 c. 1
 Expiring Laws Continuance Act 1952 c. 5
 New Valuation Lists (Postponement) Act 1952 c. 4
 Public Works Loans Act 1952 c. 3

1953

1 & 2 Eliz. 2

Public General Acts

 Accommodation Agencies Act 1953 c. 23
 Agricultural Land (Removal of Surface Soil) Act 1953 c. 10
 Appropriation Act 1953 c. 35
 Army and Air Force (Annual) Act 1953 c. 31
 Auxiliary Forces Act 1953 c. 50
 Births and Deaths Registration Act 1953 c. 20
 Coastal Flooding (Emergency Provisions) Act 1953 c. 18
 Consolidated Fund Act 1953 c. 6
 Consolidated Fund (No. 2) Act 1953 c. 8
 Dogs (Protection of Livestock) Act 1953 c. 28
 Education (Miscellaneous Provisions) Act 1953 c. 33
 Emergency Laws (Miscellaneous Provisions) Act 1953 c. 47
 Enemy Property Act 1953 c. 52
 Finance Act 1953 c. 34
 Harbours, Piers and Ferries (Scotland) Act 1953 c. 11
 Historic Buildings and Ancient Monuments Act 1953 c. 49
 Hospital Endowments (Scotland) Act 1953 c. 41
 Iron and Steel Act 1953 c. 15
 Isle of Man (Customs) Act 1953 c. 44
 Law Reform (Personal Injuries) (Amendment) Act 1953 c. 7
 Leasehold Property Act and Long Leases (Scotland) Act Extension Act 1953 c. 12
 Licensing Act 1953 c. 46
 Local Government (Miscellaneous Provisions) Act 1953 c. 26
 Local Government Superannuation Act 1953 c. 25
 Marshall Aid Commemoration Act 1953 c. 39
 Merchandise Marks Act 1953 c. 48
 Monopolies and Restrictive Practices Commission Act 1953 c. 51
 National Insurance Act 1953 c. 29
 National Insurance (Industrial Injuries) Act 1953 c. 43
 Navy and Marines (Wills) Act 1953 c. 24
 New Towns Act 1953 c. 38
 Pharmacy Act 1953 c. 19
 Post Office Act 1953 c. 36
 Prevention of Crime Act 1953 c. 14
 Registration Service Act 1953 c. 37
 Rhodesia and Nyasaland Federation Act 1953 c. 30
 Road Transport Lighting Act 1953 c. 21
 Road Transport Lighting (No. 2) Act 1953 c. 22
 Royal Titles Act 1953 c. 9
 School Crossing Patrols Act 1953 c. 45
 Slaughter of Animals (Pigs) Act 1953 c. 27
 Therapeutic Substances (Prevention of Misuse) Act 1953 c. 32
 Town and Country Planning Act 1953 c. 16
 Transport Act 1953 c. 13
 University of St. Andrews Act 1953 c. 40
 Valuation for Rating Act 1953 c. 42
 White Fish and Herring Industries Act 1953 c. 17

2 & 3 Eliz. 2

Public General Acts
 Air Corporations Act 1953 c. 7
 Armed Forces (Housing Loans) Act 1953 c. 3
 Consolidated Fund (No. 3) Act 1953 c. 2
 Electoral Registers Act 1953 c. 8
 Expiring Laws Continuance Act 1953 c. 9
 Post Office and Telegraph (Money) Act 1953 c. 4
 Public Works Loans Act 1953 c. 6
 Regency Act 1953 c. 1
 Statute Law Revision Act 1953 c. 5

1954

2 & 3 Eliz. 2

Public General Acts

 Agriculture (Miscellaneous Provisions) Act 1954 c. 39
 Appropriation Act 1954 c. 45
 Army and Air Force (Annual) Act 1954 c. 35
 Atomic Energy Authority Act 1954 c. 32
 Baking Industry (Hours of Work) Act 1954 c. 57 (commonly known as the Night Baking Act)
 British Industries Fair (Guarantees and Grants) Act 1954 c. 26
 Charitable Trusts (Validation) Act 1954 c. 58
 Cinematograph Film Production (Special Loans) Act 1954 c. 15
 Civil Defence (Armed Forces) Act 1954 c. 66
 Civil Defence (Electricity Undertakings) Act 1954 c. 19
 Consolidated Fund Act 1954 c. 22
 Coroners Act 1954 c. 31
 Cotton Act 1954 c. 24
 Currency and Bank Notes Act 1954 c. 12
 Development of Inventions Act 1954 c. 20
 Electricity Reorganisation (Scotland) Act 1954 c. 60
 Expiring Laws Continuance Act 1954 c. 69
 Finance Act 1954 c. 44
 Food and Drugs Amendment Act 1954 c. 67
 Gas and Electricity (Borrowing Powers) Act 1954 c. 52
 Hill Farming Act 1954 c. 23
 Hire-Purchase Act 1954 c. 51
 Housing Repairs and Rents Act 1954 c. 53
 Housing (Repairs and Rents) (Scotland) Act 1954 c. 50
 Industrial and Provident Societies (Amendment) Act 1954 c. 43
 Industrial Diseases (Benefit) Act 1954 c. 16
 Isle of Man (Customs) Act 1954 c. 54
 Judges' Remuneration Act 1954 c. 27
 Juries Act 1954 c. 41
 Landlord and Tenant Act 1954 c. 56
 Law Reform (Enforcement of Contracts) Act 1954 c. 34
 Law Reform (Limitation of Actions, etc.) Act 1954 c. 36
 Licensing (Seamen's Canteens) Act 1954 c. 11
 Local Government (Financial Provisions) (Scotland) Act 1954 c. 13
 Long Leases (Scotland) Act 1954 c. 49
 Marriage Act 1949 (Amendment) Act 1954 c. 47
 Merchant Shipping Act 1954 c. 18
 Mines and Quarries Act 1954 c. 70
 National Gallery and Tate Gallery Act 1954 c. 65
 National Museum of Antiquities of Scotland Act 1954 c. 14
 Navy, Army and Air Force Reserves Act 1954 c. 10
 Niall Macpherson Indemnity Act 1954 c. 29
 Overseas Resources Development Act 1954 c. 71
 Pensions (Increase) Act 1954 c. 25
 Pests Act 1954 c. 68
 Pharmacy Act 1954 c. 61
 Pool Betting Act 1954 c. 33
 Post Office Savings Bank Act 1954 c. 62
 Protection of Animals (Amendment) Act 1954 c. 40
 Protection of Animals (Anaesthetics) Act 1954 c. 46
 Protection of Birds Act 1954 c. 30
 Rights of Entry (Gas and Electricity Boards) Act 1954 c. 21
 Royal Irish Constabulary (Widows' Pensions) Act 1954 c. 17
 Slaughter of Animals (Amendment) Act 1954 c. 59
 Slaughterhouses Act 1954 c. 42
 Summary Jurisdiction (Scotland) Act 1954 c. 48
 Superannuation (President of Industrial Court) Act 1954 c. 37
 Supreme Court Officers (Pensions) Act 1954 c. 38
 Telegraph Act 1954 c. 28
 Television Act 1954 c. 55
 Town and Country Planning Act 1954 c. 72
 Town and Country Planning (Scotland) Act 1954 c. 73
 Transport Charges &c. (Miscellaneous Provisions) Act 1954 c. 64
 Trustee Savings Banks Act 1954 c. 63

3 & 4 Eliz. 2

Public General Acts

 National Insurance Act 1954 c. 1
 Wireless Telegraphy (Validation of Charges) Act 1954 c. 2

1955

3 & 4 Eliz. 2

Public General Acts

 Air Force Act 1955 c. 19
 Aliens' Employment Act 1955
 Appropriation Act 1955 c. 16
 Army Act 1955 c. 18
 British Museum Act 1955 c. 23
 Children and Young Persons (Harmful Publications) Act 1955 c. 28
 Cocos Islands Act 1955 c. 5
 Colonial Development and Welfare Act 1955 c. 6
 Consolidated Fund Act 1955 c. 3
 Crofters (Scotland) Act 1955 c. 21
 Finance Act 1955 c. 15
 Fisheries Act 1955 c. 7
 Imperial War Museum Act 1955 c. 14
 Isle of Man (Customs) Act 1955 c. 17
 National Insurance Act 1955 c. 29
 National Service Act 1955 c. 11
 New Towns Act 1955 c. 4
 Northern Ireland Act 1955 c. 8
 Oil in Navigable Waters Act 1955 c. 25
 Pensions (India, Pakistan and Burma) Act 1955 c. 22
 Public Libraries (Scotland) Act 1955 c. 27
 Public Service Vehicles (Travel Concessions) Act 1955 c. 26
 Public Works Loans Act 1955 c. 9
 Requisitioned Houses and Housing (Amendment) Act 1955 c. 24
 Revision of the Army and Air Force Acts (Transitional Provisions) Act 1955 c. 20
 Rural Water Supplies and Sewerage Act 1955 c. 13
 Transport (Borrowing Powers) Act 1955 c. 10
 Trustee Savings Banks (Pensions) Act 1955 c. 12

4 & 5 Eliz. 2

Public General Acts

 Agriculture (Improvement of Roads) Act 1955 c. 20
 Aliens' Employment Act 1955 c. 18
 Appropriation (No. 2) Act 1955 c. 3
 Austrian State Treaty Act 1955 c. 1
 County Courts Act 1955 c. 8
 Diplomatic Immunities Restriction Act 1955 c. 21
 European Coal and Steel Community Act 1955 c. 4
 Expiring Laws Continuance Act 1955 c. 22
 Finance (No. 2) Act 1955 c. 17
 Food and Drugs Act 1955 c. 16
 Friendly Societies Act 1955 c. 19
 German Conventions Act 1955 c. 2
 International Finance Corporation Act 1955 c. 5
 Miscellaneous Financial Provisions Act 1955 c. 6
 Post Office and Telegraph (Money) Act 1955 c. 14
 Rating and Valuation (Miscellaneous Provisions) Act 1955 c. 9
 Rural Water Supplies and Sewerage (No. 2) Act 1955 c. 15
 Sudan (Special Payments) Act 1955 c. 11
 Validation of Elections Act 1955 c. 10
 Validation of Elections (No. 2) Act 1955 c. 12
 Validation of Elections (No. 3) Act 1955 c. 13
 Wireless Telegraphy (Blind Persons) Act 1955 c. 7

1956

4 & 5 Eliz. 2

Public General Acts

 Administration of Justice Act 1956 c. 46
 Agricultural Mortgage Corporation Act 1956 c. 38
 Agricultural Research Act 1956 c. 28
 Agriculture (Safety, Health and Welfare Provisions) Act 1956 c. 49
 Appropriation Act 1956 c. 55
 British Caribbean Federation Act 1956 c. 63
 Charles Beattie Indemnity Act 1956 c. 27
 Children and Young Persons Act 1956 c. 24
 Clean Air Act 1956 c. 52
 Coal Industry Act 1956 c. 61
 Consolidated Fund Act 1956 c. 32
 Copyright Act 1956 c. 74
 Criminal Justice Administration Act 1956 c. 34
 Crown Estate Act 1956 c. 73
 Dentists Act 1956 c. 29
 Department of Scientific and Industrial Research Act 1956 c. 58
 Education (Scotland) Act 1956 c. 75
 Family Allowances and National Insurance Act 1956 c. 50
 Finance Act 1956 c. 54
 Food and Drugs (Scotland) Act 1956 c. 30
 Governors' Pensions Act 1956 c. 64
 Hill Farming Act 1956 c. 72
 Hotel Proprietors Act 1956 c. 62
 Housing Subsidies Act 1956 c. 33
 Leeward Islands Act 1956 c. 23
 Licensing (Airports) Act 1956 c. 37
 Local Authorities (Expenses) Act 1956 c. 36
 Local Government Elections Act 1956 c. 43
 Local Government (Street Works) (Scotland) Act 1956 c. 40
 Magistrates' Courts (Appeals from Binding Over Orders) Act 1956 c. 44
 Marriage (Scotland) Act 1956 c. 70
 Medical Act 1956 c. 76
 National Insurance Act 1956 c. 47
 Occasional Licences and Young Persons Act 1956 c. 42
 Overseas Resources Development Act 1956 c. 71
 Pakistan (Consequential Provision) Act 1956 c. 31
 Pensions (Increase) Act 1956 c. 39
 Police (Scotland) Act 1956 c. 26
 Public Works Loans Act 1956 c. 65
 Restrictive Trade Practices Act 1956 c. 68
 Road Traffic Act 1956 c. 67
 Sanitary Inspectors (Change of Designation) Act 1956 c. 66
 Sexual Offences Act 1956 c. 69
 Slum Clearance (Compensation) Act 1956 c. 57
 Small Lotteries and Gaming Act 1956 c. 45
 Solicitors (Amendment) Act 1956 c. 41
 Sugar Act 1956 c. 48
 Teachers (Superannuation) Act 1956 c. 53
 Therapeutic Substances Act 1956 c. 25
 Transport (Disposal of Road Haulage Property) Act 1956 c. 56
 Underground Works (London) Act 1956 c. 59
 Validation of Elections (Northern Ireland) Act 1956 c. 35
 Valuation and Rating (Scotland) Act 1956 c. 60
 Workmen's Compensation and Benefit (Supplementation) Act 1956 c. 51

5 & 6 Eliz. 2

Public General Acts

Local Acts
 Clyde Navigation Order Confirmation Act 1956 c. i
 Oban Burgh Order Confirmation Act 1956 c. ii

1957

5 & 6 Eliz. 2

Public General Acts

Local Acts
 Wakefield Corporation Act 1957 c. iii
 Liverpool Hydraulic Power Act 1957 c. iv
 Port of London Act 1957 c. v
 Blyth Harbour Act 1957 c. vi
 Barclays Bank D.C.O Act 1957 c. vii
 Cattledown Wharves Act 1957 c. viii
 Marine Society Act 1957 c. ix
 City of London (Various Powers) Act 1957 c. x
 Sunderland Corporation Act 1957 c. xi
 Aberdeen Harbour (Superannuation) Order Confirmation Act 1957 c. xii
 Baird Trust Order Confirmation Act 1957 c. xiii
 Glasgow Corporation Order Confirmation Act 1957 c. xiv
 Kilmarnock Corporation Order Confirmation Act 1957 c. xv
 Aberdeen Corporation Order Confirmation Act 1957 c. xvi
 University of Exeter Act 1957 c. xvii
 Buckinghamshire County Council Act 1957 c. xviii
 London County Council (Money) Act 1957 c. xix
 Croydon Corporation Act 1957 c. xx
 Tyne Improvement Act 1957 c. xxi
 Greenock Port and Harbours Order Confirmation Act 1957 c. xxii
 Clyde Navigation Order Confirmation (No.2) Act 1957 c. xxiii
 Ministry of Housing and Local Government Provisional Order (County of Berks (Consent to Letting)) Act 1957 c. xxiv
 Reading Corporation (Trolley Vehicles) Provisional Order Act 1957 c. xxv
 Doncaster Corporation (Trolley Vehicles) Provisional Order Act 1957 c. xxvi
 Durham County Council (Barmston-Coxgreen Footbridge) Act 1957 c. xxvii
 Tamar Bridge Act 1957 c. xxviii
 B.P. Trading Act 1957 c. xxix
 Portslade and Southwick Outfall Sewerage Board Act 1957 c. xxx
 Barry Corporation Act 1957 c. xxxi
 Workington Harbour and Dock (Transfer) Act 1957 c. xxxii
 British Transport Commission Act 1957 c. xxxiii
 Dartford Tunnel Act 1957 c. xxxiv
 London County Council (General Powers) Act 1957 c. xxxv
 Hastings Tramways Act 1957 c. xxxvi
 East Ham Corporation Act 1957 c. xxxvii
 Esso Petroleum Company Act 1957 c. xxxviii
 Milford Docks Act 1957 c. xxxix
 Finsbury Square Act 1957 c. xl
 Arundel Estate Act 1957 c. xli
 Whitstable Harbour Act 1957 c. xlii
 Liverpool Corporation Act 1957 c. xliii

6 & 7 Eliz. 2

Public General Acts

Local Acts
 Aberdeen Harbour Order Confirmation Act 1957 c. i
 British Transport Commission Order Confirmation Act 1957 c. ii
 Church of Scotland (General Trustees) Order Confirmation Act 1957 c. iii
 Dundee Corporation (Consolidated Powers) Order Confirmation Act 1957 c. iv
 Clyde Lighthouses Order Confirmation Act 1957 c. v

1958

6 & 7 Eliz. 2

Public General Acts

Local Acts
 Forth Road Bridge Order Confirmation Act 1958 c. vi
 Mersey Docks and Harbour Board Act 1958 c. vii
 Tyne Improvement Act 1958 c. viii
 Corporation of the Sons of the Clergy Charities Scheme Confirmation Act 1958 c. ix
 Reading Almshouse and Municipal Charities Scheme Confirmation Act 1958 c. x
 Royal Institution of Great Britain Charity Scheme Confirmation Act 1958 c. xi
 St James's Dwellings Charity Scheme Confirmation Act 1958 c. xii
 Port of London (Superannuation) Act 1958 c. xiii
 University of Leicester Act 1958 c. xiv
 Brazilian Traction Subsidiaries Act 1958 c. xv
 Cammell Laird and Company Act 1958 c. xvi
 Pier and Harbour Order (Margate) Confirmation Act 1958 c. xvii
 Holy Trinity Hounslow Act 1958 c. xviii
 Seaham Harbour Dock Act 1958 c. xix
 Blackpool Corporation Act 1958 c. xx
 London County Council (General Powers) Act 1958 c. xxi
 Clergy Orphan Corporation Act 1958 c. xxii
 Royal Society for the Prevention of Cruelty to Animals Act 1958 c. xxiii
 Essex County Council Act 1958 c. xxiv
 All Hallows the Great Churchyard Act 1958 c. xxv
 All Hallows the Less Churchyard Act 1958 c. xxvi
 London County Council (Money) Act 1958 c. xxvii
 British Transport Commission Order Confirmation Act 1958 c. xxviii
 Bradford Corporation (Trolley Vehicles) Order Confirmation Act 1958 c. xxix
 Maidstone Corporation (Trolley Vehicles) Order Confirmation Act 1958 c. xxx
 Pier and Harbour Order (Great Yarmouth) Confirmation Act 1958 c. xxxi
 Pier and Harbour Order (King's Lynn Conservancy) Confirmation Act 1958 c. xxxii
 South Lancashire Transport Act 1958 c. xxxiii
 Penybont Main Sewerage Act 1958 c. xxxiv
 Gloucester Corporation Act 1958 c. xxxv
 Coventry Corporation Act 1958 c. xxxvi
 Waltham Holy Cross Urban District Council Act 1958 c. xxxvii
 Rochdale Corporation Act 1958 c. xxxviii
 Ashton-under-Lyne Stalybridge and Dukinfield (District) Waterworks Act 1958 c. xxxix
 Royal School for Deaf Children Margate Act 1958 c. xl
 Pier and Harbour Order (Sheerness) Act 1958 c. xli
 Surrey County Council Act 1958 c. xlii
 Falmouth Docks Act 1958 c. xliii
 British Transport Commission Act 1958 c. xliv
 Tees Valley and Cleveland Water Act 1958 c. xlv
 Falmouth Harbour Act 1958 c. xlvi
 City of London (Various Powers) Act 1958 c. xlvii
 Shell (Stanlow to Partington Pipeline) Act 1958 c. xlviii
 Birmingham Corporation Act 1958 c. xlix
 Wallasey Corporation Act 1958 c. l

7 & 8 Eliz. 2

Public General Acts

Local Acts
 Church of Scotland Trust Order Confirmation Act 1958 c. i
 North of Scotland Electricity Order Confirmation Act 1958 c. ii
 Society in Scotland for Propagating Christian Knowledge Order Confirmation Act 1958 c. iii
 Glasgow Corporation Order Confirmation Act 1958 c. iv
 Edinburgh Corporation Order Confirmation Act 1958 c. v
 Kent County Council Act 1958 c. vi
 Manchester Corporation Act 1958 c. vii

1959

7 & 8 Eliz. 2

Public General Acts

Local Acts
 Angle Ore and Transport Company Act 1959 c. viii
 Railway Clearing System Superannuation Fund Act 1959 c. ix
 Tees Conservancy Act 1959 c. x
 Glamorgan County Council Act 1959 c. xi
 Gloucestershire County Council Act 1959 c. xii
 All Saints Chelsea Act 1959 c. xiii
 Hospital of St. Mary Magdalene and other Charities (Newcastle-upon-Tyne) Charity Scheme Confirmation Act 1959 c. xiv
 Hospital of St. Nicholas (Salisbury) Charity Scheme Confirmation Act 1959 c. xv
 Jesus Hospital (Rothwell) Charity Scheme Confirmation Act 1959 c. xvi
 Poor's Coal Charity (Wavendon) Charity Scheme Confirmation Act 1959 c. xvii
 Ministry of Housing and Local Government Provisional Order Confirmation (West Hertfordshire Main Drainage) Act 1959 c. xviii
 Calvinistic Methodist or Presbyterian Church of Wales (Amendment) Act 1959 c. xix
 Glasgow Corporation Order Confirmation Act 1959 c. xx
 Royal Wanstead School Act 1959 c. xxi
 Birmingham Corporation Act 1959 c. xxii
 Round Oak Steel Works (Level Crossings) Act 1959 c. xxiii
 Railway Passengers Assurance Act 1959 c. xxiv
 North Devon Water Act 1959 c. xxv
 Thames Conservancy Act 1959 c. xxvi
 Middlesex County Council Act 1959 c. xxvii
 Port of London Act 1959 c. xxviii
 Bradford Corporation Act 1959 c. xxix
 Finsbury Square Act 1959 c. xxx
 London County Council (Money) Act 1959 c. xxxi
 Bucks Water Board Act 1959 c. xxxii
 Reading and Berkshire Water, &c Act 1959 c. xxxiii
 Edinburgh College of Art Order Confirmation Act 1959 c. xxxiv
 Leith Harbour and Docks Order Confirmation Act 1959 c. xxxv
 British Transport Commission Order Confirmation Act 1959 c. xxxvi
 Pier and Harbour Order (Gloucester) Confirmation Act 1959 c. xxxvii
 Pier and Harbour Order (Medway Lower Navigation) Confirmation Act 1959 c. xxxviii
 Joseph Rowntree Memorial Trust Act 1959 c. xxxix
 Falmouth Docks Act 1959 c. xl
 Bootle Corporation Act 1959 c. xli
 Tees Valley and Cleveland Water Act 1959 c. xlii
 Mid-Wessex Water Act 1959 c. xliii
 British Transport Commission Act 1959 c. xliv
 Portsmouth Corporation Act 1959 c. xlv
 Humber Bridge Act 1959 c. xlvi
 Shell-Mex and B.P. (London Airport Pipeline) Act 1959 c. xlvii
 Halifax Corporation Act 1959 c. xlviii
 City of London (Various Powers) Act 1959 c. xlix
 South Wales Transport Act 1959 c. l
 Lee Valley Water Act 1959 c. li
 London County Council (General Powers) Act 1959 c. lii

8 & 9 Eliz. 2

Public General Acts

Local Acts
 Aberdeen Harbour Order Confirmation Act 1959 c. i
 Clyde Navigation Order Confirmation Act 1959 c. ii

See also
List of Acts of the Parliament of the United Kingdom

References

1940
1940s in the United Kingdom
1950s in the United Kingdom